Phytoecia haroldi is a species of beetle in the family Cerambycidae. It was described by Fahraeus in 1872. It is known from Malawi.

References

Phytoecia
Beetles described in 1872